Antore Bahire is a 2012 Bengali drama film directed by Somnath Sen and edited by Dipak Mandal. Arindam Bhattacharjee is the cinematographer of the film. The film stars Debashree Roy and Abhishek Chatterjee, and marks the big screen debut of actress Chitrangada Chakraborty. The music and background score of the film was composed by Chandan Roy Chowdhury with lyrics penned by Somnath Sen.

Synopsis 
Dipto and Riddhi are married working in a corporate office, both have busy work schedules. All was well until Dipto began an extramarital affair with his colleague, Shruti. Presently, they are awaiting a divorce. A mysterious entity known as Khushi enters their lives and controls their destinies.

Cast 
 Debashree Roy as Khushi
 Abhishek Chatterjee
 Moubani Sorcar as Riddhi

 Kalyan Chatterjee
 Bodhisatya Majumdar
 Jack as Arjun
 Chitrangada Chakraborty as Shruti
 Abhiraj as Dipto

Songs

References

External links
 
 

Bengali-language Indian films
2010s Bengali-language films
Indian drama films